Marcus Allan (born 23 May 1986) is an Australian rules footballer in the Australian Football League. He played for WAFL club Claremont in 2008. He is currently playing for the Old Xaverians in the VAFA. 

He is the sοn of Collingwood and Fitzroy player Graeme "Gubby" Allan, who is now the General Manager of Football Operations at Team GWS.

Marcus attended St. Joseph's College, Gregory Terrace in Brisbane.

Career

Brisbane Lions 
He was recruited by Brisbane thrοugh the 2005 AFL Rοοkie Draft, frοm the Northern Eagles AFC in Zillmere, Queensland. He was elevated tο the Brisbane Lions seniοr list in 2006, when he made his debut in Rοund 19.

Marcus played 5 games for Brisbane before he was delisted by Brisbane Football Club on 22 September 2007.

Claremont Tigers 
Marcus still had ambitions to play senior AFL football and signed with WAFL club Claremont. He played his first game against West Perth and showed flashes of the brilliance that earned him a spot on the Brisbane list.

Aspley Hornets
On 10 February, Marcus Allan joined his original club, Aspley Hornets for their debut season in the AFLQ.
Allan, who played five games with the Brisbane Lions across 2006-07 before moving to the WAFL last season, is waiting on a clearance from Claremont.

Trivia 
Marcus wears number 42, however now wears the number 3 for Claremont.

Statistics
 Statistics are correct as of Round 23, 2008 (1 October 2008)

References 

1986 births
Living people
Claremont Football Club players
Brisbane Lions players
Zillmere Eagles Australian Football Club players
Aspley Football Club players
Australian rules footballers from Queensland